Geinitzia is an extinct genus of flying insects belonging to the order Reculida and family Geinitziidae. Species belonging to the genus lived from the Permian to the Jurassic and have been found in China, Germany, Kyrgyzstan, the United Kingdom, Japan, and Russia.

Species
A number of species have been described in Geinitzia.
G. annosa
G. aristovi
G. asiatica
G. carpentieri
G. dorni
G. ima
G. latrunculorum
G. minor
G. perlaesa
G. reticulata
G. sagulensis
G. schlieffeni
G. subita
G. superaucta
G. varia

References 

Permian animals
Triassic animals
Jurassic animals
Prehistoric insect genera
Polyneoptera